Sun Giant is the second EP by American band Fleet Foxes, released on April 8, 2008, by Sub Pop and Bella Union. While the EP was released prior to their debut album, Fleet Foxes, Sun Giant was recorded after the LP. Sun Giant was originally intended to be a tour only release, but demand from fans led to its official release. Fleet Foxes had stated that Sun Giant was pressed so that they had something to sell on tour, and clarified that the music was not indicative of their ambitions. Despite this, the EP met with wide critical acclaim; it was named the #1 album of the year by Pitchfork in conjunction with their debut LP.

Reception

Billboard said that the EP featured "harmony-rich songs more in keeping with Crosby, Stills & Nash, a welcome turn away from the agitated dance-rock still so prominent in the indie world."  Rolling Stone gave the EP three-out-of-four stars, and said that "with ramshackle rising-and-falling guitars, CSNY-style harmonies and the occasional mandolin plink, this five-track EP will make you pine for summer in the country," although the magazine said their song-writing was a bit thin.

Track listing

Personnel 
The liner notes state that: "We all played many an instrument. An itemized and individualized list would be egotistical and tiresome"
Robin Pecknold – [lead] vocals, various instruments [uncredited: guitar]
Skyler Skjelset – various instruments [uncredited: lead guitar, mandolin, vocals]
Casey Wescott – various instruments [uncredited: piano, keyboards, vocals]
Christian Wargo – various instruments [uncredited: bass, guitar, vocals]
Nicholas Peterson – various instruments [uncredited: drums, percussion, vocals]
Phil Ek – producer, engineer, mixing
Ed Brooks – mastering

References

External links
"Mykonos" music video on YouTube

Fleet Foxes albums
2008 EPs
Albums produced by Phil Ek
Bella Union EPs
Sub Pop EPs
Albums recorded at Bear Creek Studio